Physella gyrina, common name the "tadpole physa", is a species of small, left-handed or sinistral, air-breathing freshwater snail, an aquatic pulmonate gastropod mollusk in the family Physidae.

Shell description
Snails in the family Physidae have shells that are sinistral, which means that if the shell is held with the spire pointing up, and the aperture is facing the observer, the aperture is on the left-hand side.

The shells of Physella species have a long and large aperture, a pointed spire, and no operculum. The shells are thin and corneous and rather transparent.

Distribution
This species is known to occur in:
 the USA - indigenous
 Great Britain - introduced
 Ireland - introduced
 Spain

References

External links 
Physella gyrina at Animalbase taxonomy,short description, distribution, biology,status (threats), images 

Physidae
Molluscs of North America
Fauna of the Great Lakes region (North America)
Gastropods described in 1821
Taxa named by Thomas Say